The 1992 Atlantic 10 men's basketball tournament was played from March 7 to March 9, 1992, and March 7, 1992. The first round game was played at McGonigle Hall in Philadelphia, Pennsylvania. The second round and semifinal games were played at the Palestra in Philadelphia, while the championship game was played at Curry Hicks Cage in Amherst, Massachusetts.  The winner was named champion of the Atlantic 10 Conference and received an automatic bid to the 1992 NCAA Men's Division I Basketball Tournament. The University of Massachusetts won the tournament. Temple also received a bid to the NCAA Tournament. Harper Williams of Massachusetts was named the tournament's Most Outstanding Player, while teammate and future NBA player Lou Roe was among those also named to the All-Championship Team.  The top seven teams in the conference received first-round byes.

Bracket

* - Overtime

Atlantic 10 men's basketball tournament
Tournament
Atlantic 10 men's basketball tournament
Atlantic 10 men's basketball tournament
Atlantic 10 men's basketball tournament